Oluyemi Oluleke Osinbajo  (born 8 March 1957) is a Nigerian lawyer, professor, and politician who is the 14th and current Vice President of Nigeria since 2015. A member of the All Progressives Congress (APC), he previously served as Attorney General of Lagos State from 1999 to 2007 and holds the title of Senior Advocate of Nigeria. In April 2022, he announced his intention to run for the APC nomination for President of Nigeria in the 2023 presidential election. He was third in the APC presidential primaries held in June 2022 with a total of 235 votes from the delegates.

Born in Lagos in 1957, Osinbajo is a graduate of the University of Lagos and London School of Economics. Shortly thereafter, he started teaching at University of Lagos while practicing law until 1999. That year, Osinbajo was appointed Attorney-General and Commissioner for Justice in the cabinet of Lagos State Governor Bola Tinubu. After serving during both of Tinubu's four-year terms, Osinbajo left government in 2007 and returned to law and lecturing along with preaching in the Redeemed Christian Church of God.

Prior to the 2015 presidential election, Osinbajo was chosen as the running mate to APC nominee Muhammadu Buhari. Their ticket went on to defeat the then-incumbent duo of President Goodluck Jonathan and Vice President Namadi Sambo. Four years later, the ticket was re-elected over the Peoples Democratic Party's Atiku Abubakar and Peter Obi. Osinbajo's tenure has been marked by his rising profile, especially when he took power as Acting President while Buhari went abroad. Actions taken during his brief stints as the leader of the nation were decisive but contrasted with Buhari's style and were controversial among Buhari's inner circle.

Family
Yemi Osinbajo was born into the family of Opeoluwa Osinbajo on 8 March 1957, Creek Hospital, Lagos. Osinbajo is married to Dolapo (née Soyode) Osinbajo, a granddaughter of Obafemi Awolowo. They have three children: two daughters, Damilola and Kanyinsola, and a son, Fiyinfoluwa Osinbajo.

Education
Osinbajo was educated at Corona primary School, in Lagos. He attended Igbobi College in Yaba, Lagos, from 1969 to 1975, where he won the following awards:
the State Merit Award (1971);
the School Prize for English Oratory (1972);
Adeoba Prize for English Oratory (1972-1975);
Elias Prize for Best Performance in History (WASC, 1973);
School Prize for Literature (HSC, 1975); and
African Statesman Intercollegiate Best Speaker's Prize (1974).

Thereafter he studied for his undergraduate degree at the University of Lagos between 1975 and 1978, when he obtained a Second Class Honours (Upper Division) Degree in Law. Here, he also won the Graham-Douglas Prize for Commercial Law. In 1979, he completed the mandatory one-year professional training at the Nigerian Law School whereon he was admitted to practice as a Barrister and Solicitor of the Supreme Court of Nigeria. In 1980, he attended the London School of Economics, where he obtained a Master of Laws degree.

Early career
From 1979 to 1980, Osinbajo served the compulsory one-year youth service as a legal officer with Bendel Development and Planning Authority (BDPA), Bendel State.

In 1981, he was employed as a law lecturer at the University of Lagos, Nigeria. From 1983 to 1986, he was a Senior Lecturer of Law at the University of Lagos. From 1988 to 1992, he was an Adviser (legal advice and litigation) to the Attorney-General and Minister of Justice, Bola Ajibola. Osinbajo began lecturing at the age of 23.

From 1997 to 1999 he was made professor of law and head of Department of Public Law, University of Lagos.

From 1999 to 2007, Osinbajo was a Member of Cabinet, Lagos State Ministry of Justice, also Attorney-General and Commissioner for Justice.

In 2007, Osinbajo was made Senior Partner at Simmons Cooper Partners (Barristers and Solicitors), Nigeria.

From 2007 to 2013 Osinbajo was once again employed as a Professor of Law, Department of Public Law, Faculty of Law, University of Lagos. He was also a Senior lecturer at Lagos State University.

His other past roles include:

 Staff Member, United Nations Operations in Somalia, Justice Division, UNOSOM II.
 Member, United Nations Secretary General's Committee of Experts on Conduct and Discipline of UN, Peacekeeping Personnel around the globe, Member, 2006.
 Partner in the law firm of Osinbajo, Kukoyi & Adokpaye.

Pastoral career
Osinbajo is the pastor in charge of the Lagos Province 48 (Olive Tree provincial headquarters) of the Redeemed Christian Church of God.

All Progressives Congress (APC) 
After the formation of the All Progressives Congress (APC) in 2013, Yemi was tasked with other notable Nigerians to design and produce a manifesto for the new political party. This culminated in the presentation of the "Roadmap to a New Nigeria", a document published by APC as its manifesto if elected to power. The highlights of the Roadmap included a free schools meal plan, a conditional cash transfer to the 25 million poorest Nigerians if they enroll children in school and immunize them. There were also a number of programs designed to create economic opportunities for Nigeria's massive youth population.

On 17 December 2014 the presidential candidate of the All Progressives Congress, retired General Muhammadu Buhari, announced Osinbajo as his running mate and vice-presidential candidate for the 2015 general elections. During the 2014/2015 campaigns of the All progressives Congress, Yemi Osinbajo held numerous town hall meetings across the country as against the popular rallies that many Nigerians and their politicians were used to. One of his campaign promises, which he has recently reiterated, was the plan to feed a school child a meal per day. Beyond feeding the school children, he has recently emphasized that this plan will create jobs (another campaign promise) for those who will make it happen.

Vice Presidency
On 31 March 2015, Muhammadu Buhari was confirmed by the Independent National Electoral Commission (INEC) as the winner of the presidential elections. Thus, Osinbajo became the Vice President-elect of Nigeria. They were both sworn in on 29 May 2015. On 17 August 2017 VP Yemi Osinbajo described hate speech as a species of terrorism.

First Term 
Tenure
Yemi Osinbajo assumed office after taking the oath of office on 29 May 2015 at the Eagle Square, Abuja. As the Vice President of the Federal Republic of Nigeria, he is expected to oversee the economic planning team and report as well as make recommendations to the president who takes the final decision. Because of his legal background and antecedents as a commissioner for justice in Lagos state for eight years, many expect that he will contribute a great deal to the much needed reform of the judicial system at the national level.

Acting President

President Muhammadu Buhari wrote a written declaration on 9 May 2017 to the president of the senate and house of representatives on his decision to embark on a medical trip; the letter was read that day at a plenary assembly of both the senate and the house of representatives. The acting presidency was conferred upon Vice president Osinbajo during President Buhari's medical leave.

On 7 August 2018, Osinbajo fired the State Security Service boss, Lawal Daura for illegal invasion of National Assembly by armed and masked operatives of the department. Daura has been replaced with Matthew Seiyefa.

Second Term

In January 2019, Osinbajo criticized the fact that social media is currently "under multi-jurisdictional regulation". He called for more collaboration among nations to reach a convention to regulate social media and counter hate speech.

On 2 February 2019, Osinbajo's helicopter crashed in Kabba, Kogi State. He survived, and delivered a previously-scheduled campaign speech after the crash. In the speech, he said he was "extremely grateful to the Lord for preserving our lives from the incident that just happened. Everyone of us is safe and no one is maimed."

Tenure

On 29 May 2019, Professor Yemi Osinbajo took his oath of office to begin his second term at Eagle Square in the capital of Abuja.

Following the federal government's decision to close the nation's land borders in October 2019, Osinbajo explained that the government did so to gain the attention of other nations to the importance of policing the borders. He claimed that China and other nations were smuggling in products, including agricultural ones, undermining the Nigerian economy and threatening Nigerian agriculture. By closing the borders, Osinbajo claimed that the government was helping protect the economy and Nigeria's producers and farmers.

In October 2019, Osinbajo criticized the government's proposed social media regulations, stating he did "not think that government regulation is necessarily the way to go". Instead, he asked citizens to take more active steps to police social media. He stated that citizens and leaders, both political and religious, "owe a responsibility to our society and to everyone else, to ensure that we don't allow it to become an instrument" of war. He also warned people against using social media to spread "religious disinformation", which could lead to conflict and war.

On 31 March 2020, President Muhammadu Buhari appointed Vice president Osinbajo to chair an economic sustainability committee. The aim of the committee is to develop measures to cushion the effect of the coronavirus and eventually reposition the Nigerian economy.

In July 2020, his spokesman stated that Osinbajo has become a "political target", stating "I'm his spokesperson and all I know he wants to do is to do this job that he has been given very well and he doesn't have any other plans right now about any such thing. I can tell you that clearly."

Controversy
In an exclusive report by Peoples Gazette, Yemi Osinbajo's law firm, SimmonsCooper, was linked to an onshore money-laundering front, Ocean Trust Limited, which is owned by the national leader of the All Progressives Congress and erstwhile boss of Osinbajo while a commissioner in Lagos State, Bola Tinubu. The report established a link between the shell company and Osinbajo's law firm through bank transactions showing credit transfers to its accounts. The law firm had earlier denied any interaction or business relationship with the shell company, threatening to sue The Punch for linking it with Ocean Trust.

Electoral law violation

In another exclusive report by Peoples Gazette which cited bank records, Osinbajo received 200 million naira in the run-up to the 2015 presidential election from Guaranty Trust Holding Company PLC's Investment One, in three tranches of N100 million, N50 million and N50 million, in violation of federal campaign finance law - which only approves the donation limit of N1 million to a candidate in a presidential race. The managing partners at Osinbajo's firm SimmonsCooper also donated the sum of N50 million in two payments of N25 million. Other lawyers with a relationship with Osinbajo donated N10 million to the campaign bank account. All of this was in violation of the electoral law. Osinbajo did not disclose these violations to the electoral body or police.

Awards and memberships

Awards 
Yemi Osinbajo, has received several awards, they include:
 State Merit Award 1971
 the School Prize for English Oratory, 1972
Adeoba Prize for English Oratory 1972–1975
Elias Prize for Best Performance in History (WASC) 1973
School Prize for Literature (HSC), 1975
African Statesman Intercollegiate Best Speaker's Prize, 1974
President Goodluck Jonathan conferred on Osinbajo the Grand Commander of the Order of the Niger on 28 May 2015.
During a visit on 3 November 2019 to Daura, the Emir of Daura, Faruk Umar, called Osinbajo "the most trustworthy Vice President of Nigeria" and thanked him for his loyalty to President Buhari's administration. The Emir then gave him the title of Danmadami of Daura, the highest traditional title in the emirate.

Memberships
He is a member of the following professional bodies:
 Nigerian Bar Association
International Bar Association
 Nigerian Body of Benchers
 Council of Legal Education in Nigeria and Senior Advocate of Nigeria

The 8th March Initiative 
The initiative was conceptualized, as a way to celebrate Prof  Yemi Osinbajo's birthday by a group that refers to themselves as 'Friends of Prof'. With its aim stated as 'inspiring and promoting entrepreneurial endeavors within Nigeria in honor of the Vice President Yemi Osinbajo'.  The initiative, In 2020, provided a number of start-ups and small businesses with one-off grants and plans to do same in 2021. Also, it plans to recognize Health workers at the fore front of the fight against COVID-19 while providing nationwide medical intervention.

Publications
Chapters contributed to books
 The Common Law, The Evidence Act and The Interpretation of Section 5(a) in Essays in Honour of Judge Elias (1986) (J.A. Omotola, ed) pgs. 165-18;
 Some Reforms in The Nigerian Law of Evidence Chapter in Law and Development (1986), (J.A. Omotola and A.A. Adeogun eds.) pgs. 282–311;
 Rules of Evidence in Criminal Trials in the Nigerian Special Military Tribunals Chapter 2 in Essays on Nigerian Law, Vol ... 1, Pgs. 28–42. (J.A. Omotola ed)
 Some Public Law Considerations in Environmental Protection.  Chapter in "Environmental Laws in Nigeria", (J.A. Omotola ed.) 1990 pgs 128–149
 Domestic and International Protection for Women: "Landmarks on the Journey so far" in Women and Children under Nigerian Law".  (Awa U. Kalu & Yemi Osinbajo eds.) 1990. pgs. 231–241
 Some Problems of Proof of Bank Frauds and Other Financial Malpractices in Bank Frauds and Other Financial Malpractices in Nigeria (Awa Kalu ed.)
 FMJL Review Series, Modalities For The Implementation of The Transition Provisions in The New Constitution in Law Development and Administration (Yemi Osinbajo & Awa Kalu eds.) (1990).
 FMJL Review Series, Legal and Institutional Framework For The Eradication of Drug Trafficking in Nigeria – Narcotics: Laws and Policy in Nigeria (Awa Kalu & Yemi Osinbajo eds.) 1990
 Proof of Customary Law in non-Customary Courts, – Towards a Restatement of Nigerian Customary Laws, (Osinbajo & Awa Kalu eds.) 1991
 External Debt Management: Case Study of Nigeria – International Finance and External Debt Management, UNDP/UNCTC, 1991
 Judicial and Quasi-judicial Processing of Economic and organised Crimes: Experiences, Problems etc.  Essays in Honour of Judge Bola Ajibola, (Prof. C.O. Okonkwo ed.) 1992
 Human Rights, Economic Development and the Corruption Factor in Human Rights and the Rule of Law and Development in Africa (Paul T. Zeleza et al. eds) 2004

Articles published in law journals
 Legitimacy and Illegitimacy under Nigerian Law Nig. J. Contemp. Law. (1984–87) pgs. 30–45
 Unraveling Evidence of Spouses in Nigeria, Legal Practitioners Review Vol. 1 No. 2 1987 pgs. 23–28
 Can States Legislate on Rules of Evidence?  Nigerian Current Law Review 1985 pgs. 234–242
 Problems of Proof in Declaration of Title to Land, Journal of Private and Property Law Vol. 6 & 7, October 1986, pgs. 47–68
 Interpretation of Section 131(a) of the Evidence Act. Journal of Private and Property Law Vol. 6 & 7 (1986), pgs. 118–122
 Review of Some Decrees of the Structural Adjustment Era (Part 1, 2, 3), (1989) 2 GRBPL No. 2 (Gravitas Review of Business and Property Law) pgs.60–63, (1989) 2 GRBPL No. 3 (Gravitas Review of Business and Property Law) pgs. 51–55, (1989) 2 GRBPL No. 4 (Gravitas Review of Business and Property Law)
 Current Issues in Transnational Lending and Debt Restructuring Agreements part 1 and 2, Autonomy, Academic Freedom and the Laws Establishing Universities in Nigeria (1990) Jus. Vol. 1 No. 2, pgs. 53–64, Admissibility of Computer Generated Evidence.  (1990) Jus. Vol. 1 No. 1 pgs. 9–12
 Allegations of Crime in Civil Proceedings, U.I. Law Review 1987;
 Roles, Duties and Liabilities of Collateral Participants and Professional Advisers in Unit Trust Schemes (1991) Jus. Vol. 1 No. 7 pgs. 71–83, Reform of the Criminal Law of Evidence in Nigeria (1991) Jus. 2 No. 4 Pgs. 71–98
 Profit and Loss Sharing Banks – (1990) Jus. Vol. 2 No. 8, Juvenile Justice Administration in Nigeria.
 A review of the Beijing Rules. (1991) Jus. Vol. 2 No. 6. Pgs. 65–73
 Sovereign Immunity in International Commercial Arbitration – The Nigerian experience and emerging state practice- In African Journal of International and Comparative Law, 4 RADIC 1992, page 1-25, Human Rights and Economic Development in The International Lawyer.  1994, Vol. 28, No. 3 pgs. 727–742
 Legality in a Collapsed State:  The Somalia Experience 45 ICLQ 1996, pgs. 910–924.

Books published/edited
 Nigerian Media Law, GRAVITAS Publishers 1991
 Cases and Materials on Nigerian Law of Evidence, Macmillan, 1996
 Integration of the African Continent Through Law" (Edward Foakes Publishers, 1989, vol. 7, Federal Ministry of Justice Law Review Series)
 Towards A Better Administration of Justice System in Nigeria" (Edward Foakes Publishers, 1989)
 FMJL Review Series, "Women and Children Under Nigerian Law"
 FMJL Review Series, The Unification and Reform of the Nigerian Criminal Law and Procedure Codes – (Malthouse Press), 1990
 Law Development and Administration (Malthouse Press), 1990
 Narcotics: Law and Policy in Nigeria, FMJL Review Series 1990
 Perspectives on Human Rights in Nigeria FMJL Review Series 1991
 Perspectives on Corruption in Nigeria, FMJL Review Series 1992
 Democracy and the Law, FMJL Review Series, 1991
 The Citizens Report Card on Local Governments (with Omayeli Omatsola 1998)
 Economic, Social and Cultural Rights – A training Agenda for Nigeria (with Bankole Olubamise and Yinka Balogun, 1998) Legal Research and Resource Development Centre
 Annotated Rules of the Superior Courts of Nigeria (with Ade Ipaye)    Lexis-Nexis Butterworths 2004
 Cross Examination: A Trial Lawyer's Most Potent Weapon (with Fola-Arthur Worrey) Lexis-Nexis Butterworths 2006

See also
 List of Senior Advocates of Nigeria
 Vice President of Nigeria
 List of Nigerians

References

External links 

"Yemi Osinbajo" at The Guardian: Nigeria.

1957 births
20th-century Nigerian lawyers
21st-century Nigerian lawyers
21st-century Nigerian politicians
All Progressives Congress politicians
Alumni of the London School of Economics
Attorneys General of Lagos State
Awolowo family
Candidates in the 2015 Nigerian general election
Igbobi College alumni
Lawyers from Lagos
Living people
Nigerian Christian clergy
Nigerian Law School alumni
Nigerian motivational speakers
Politicians from Lagos
Senior Advocates of Nigeria
University of Lagos alumni
Academic staff of the University of Lagos
Vice presidents of Nigeria
Survivors of aviation accidents or incidents
Academic staff of Lagos State University